Introducing... Belle & Sebastian is an EP released by Belle & Sebastian in 2008 on Jeepster Records.  The EP was compiled from the band's earlier material, ranging from their debut in 1996 to 2001.

Track listing
1. "The Boy With the Arab Strap" - 5:16
Originally appeared on The Boy with the Arab Strap in 1998
2. "Expectations" - 3:36
Originally appeared on Tigermilk in 1996
3. "Get Me Away from Here I'm Dying" - 3:27
Originally appeared on If You're Feeling Sinister in 1996
4. "Women's Realm" - 4:37
Originally appeared on Fold Your Hands Child, You Walk Like a Peasant in 2000
5. "Jonathan David" - 3:00
Originally released as Jonathan David in 2001

References

Belle and Sebastian EPs
2008 EPs